The An Nam chí lược (literally Abbreviated Records of An Nam) is a historical text that was compiled by the Vietnamese historian Lê Tắc during his exile in China in early 14th century. Published for the first time in 1335 during the reign of the Yuan dynasty, An Nam chí lược became one of the few historical books about Đại Việt that survive from the 14th and 15th centuries, and it is considered the oldest historical work by a Vietnamese that has been preserved.

History of compilation 
Lê Tắc (or Lê Trắc) was an advisor of the Marquis Chương Hiến Trần Kiện who was the son of Prince Tĩnh Quốc Trần Quốc Khang and grandson of the emperor Trần Thái Tông. During the 1285 invasion of Đại Việt by the Yuan dynasty, Trần Kiện surrendered to Kublai Khan's prince Toghan, but he was killed before he could flee to the northern border. As a subordinate of Trần Kiện, Lê Tắc followed his master to China, he survived the ambush that killed Trần Kiện and afterwards lived in exile in the town of Hanyang, Hubei. During his exile in Hanyang, Lê Tắc compiled the An Nam chí lược to recite the history, geography and culture of Đại Việt. A study shows that Lê Tắc wrote his work around the period from 1285 to 1307 and continuously supplemented until 1339, from the foreword of Lê Tắc, one knows that An Nam chí lược was published for the first time in 1335 during the reign of the Emperor Huizong of Yuan, it was subsequently published in the library Siku Quanshu of the Qing dynasty. During the reign of the Ming dynasty, an author also based on An Nam chí lược to write an extensive records about Vietnam named Việt Kiệu thư.

During the Fourth Chinese domination, many valuable books of Đại Việt were taken away by the Ming dynasty and subsequently were lost. Hence the An Nam chí lược became one of the few historical books about Đại Việt that survive from the 14th and 15th centuries and it is considered the oldest historical work compiled by a Vietnamese that has been preserved. Only in early 20th century, the book was brought back to Vietnam through a version that was printed in Japan in 1884, An Nam chí lược was translated into Vietnamese in 1961.

Description
In An Nam chí lược, Lê Tắc recounted the history and other aspects of his country Đại Việt from its beginning to the reign of the Trần dynasty. The title of the book literally means Abbreviated Records of An Nam with An Nam (Pacified South) was the Chinese name for Vietnam during the Tang dynasty, thus An Nam chí lược was written with a Chinese bias. The contents of An Nam chí lược are arranged in 20 chapters (quyển), except for details dating from Lê Tắc's lifetime, An Nam chí lược is derived almost entirely from Chinese accounts and contains some records that cannot be found elsewhere. Today 19 chapters are preserved in the original form except the 20th chapter named Danh công đề vịnh An Nam chí that was lost.

According to Keith Weller Taylor in his The Birth of Vietnam, although Lê Tắc wrote his work in China, the An Nam chí lược still reflects his Vietnamese root and thoughts that result in some materials about "rebels" of Chinese authority which one would not expect from a Chinese historian. For example, An Nam chí lược is the earliest surviving historical book to mention Lady Triệu who led a rebellion against the kingdom of Eastern Wu in 3rd century. Besides the historical accounts, An Nam chí lược also contains valuable information about the geography, tradition and culture of Vietnam such as the influence of Taoism in Đại Việt. The oldest records about the activities of Đại Việt people from the ancient time to the Trần dynasty are found in the first chapter of the An Nam chí lược, by his own experiences, Lê Tắc made a detailed description about the Vietnamese tradition of singing, dancing and musical instruments. From this account, it is known that Vietnamese people has an old tradition of creating songs in native language together with tunes in Chinese.

Table of contents

References

Notes

Bibliography

External links 
 An Nam chí lược.
 CHINA ACADEMIC DIGITAL ASSOCIATIVE LIBRARY──An Nam chí lược, 1-4
 CHINA ACADEMIC DIGITAL ASSOCIATIVE LIBRARY──An Nam chí lược, 5-9
 CHINA ACADEMIC DIGITAL ASSOCIATIVE LIBRARY──An Nam chí lược, 10-14
 CHINA ACADEMIC DIGITAL ASSOCIATIVE LIBRARY──An Nam chí lược, 15-20

Trần dynasty texts
1335 books
History books about Vietnam
14th-century history books
Chinese-language literature of Vietnam